Shiveluch, also called Sheveluch, which originates from the name "suelich" which means "smoking mountain" in Itelmen is the northernmost active volcano in Kamchatka Krai, Russia. It and Karymsky are Kamchatka's largest, most active and most continuously erupting volcanoes, as well as one of the most active on the planet. Shiveluch erupts around 0.015 km³ of magma per year, which causes frequent and large hot avalanches and lava dome formations at the summit. Ash emissions from this volcano often disrupt air traffic connecting the Asian and North American continents.

Geography 
The nearest settlement from the volcano is Klyuchi, situated 50 km from the mountain. The settlement is small enough to evacuate rapidly in case of a major eruption.

Geologic setting 
Shiveluch is a volcano within the Kuril-Kamchatka volcanic arc which hosts tens of other volcanoes. As the Pacific Plate crust subducts deeper under the Okhotsk Plate, the boiling points of minerals underground are reduced by other materials including water which results in the materials melting and forming into magma which rises onto the surface and forms the volcanoes.

Structure 
There are three elements of the volcano: the stratovolcano Old Shiveluch (Старый Шивелуч); an ancient caldera; and the active Young Shiveluch (Молодой Шивелуч), with an elevation of about 2,800 metres (9,186 ft). Shiveluch is one of Kamchatka's largest and most active volcanic structures. It is a stratovolcano composed of alternating layers of solidified ash, hardened lava and volcanic rocks.

Geologic history 
Shiveluch began forming about 60,000 to 70,000 years ago, and it has had at least 60 large eruptions during the Holocene. During this era, the most intense period of volcanism — including frequent large and moderate eruptions — occurred around 6500–6400 BC, 2250–2000 BC, and AD 50–650. This coincides with the peak of activity in other Kamchatka volcanoes. The current active period started around 900 BC. Since then, the large and moderate eruptions have been following each other at 50 to 400 year-long intervals. Catastrophic eruptions took place in 1854 and 1957, when a large part of the lava dome collapsed and created a devastating debris avalanche.

The most recent eruption of Young Shiveluch started on August 15, 1999, and continues . On February 27, 2015 Shiveluch erupted shooting ash into the atmosphere about 30,000 feet crossing the Bering Sea and into Alaska.

Gallery

References

External links

 Shiveluch  at map 
 Webcam of Shiveluch 
 Shiveluch activity at official site of Institute Volcanology and Seismology DVO RAS
 Article about volcano at official site
 Shiveluch at Global Volcanism Program
 Shiveluch at Volcano Live
 Article about volcano Shiveluch
 Google Maps satellite image

Volcanoes of the Kamchatka Peninsula
Mountains of the Kamchatka Peninsula
Active volcanoes
VEI-5 volcanoes
20th-century volcanic events
19th-century volcanic events
Calderas of Russia
Stratovolcanoes of Russia
Pleistocene stratovolcanoes
Holocene stratovolcanoes